Quintanilla del Agua y Tordueles is a municipality located in the province of Burgos, Castile and León, Spain. According to the 2004 census (INE), the municipality has a population of 582 inhabitants. Its seat is in Quintanilla del Agua.

References

Municipalities in the Province of Burgos